Tagetes minuta  is a tall upright marigold plant from the genus Tagetes, with small flowers, native to the southern half of South America. Since Spanish colonization, it has been introduced around the world, and has become naturalized in Europe, Asia, Australasia, North America, and Africa. Tagetes minuta has numerous local names that vary by region. In the Andes it is known as Huacatay or Wacatay, and in other regions it is common as chinchilla, chiquilla, chilca, zuico, suico, or anisillo. Other names include muster John Henry, southern marigold, khakibos, stinking roger, wild marigold, and black mint.

It is used as a culinary herb in Peru, Ecuador, and parts of Chile and Bolivia. It is called by the Quechua terms huacatay in Peru or wakataya in Bolivia. It is commonly sold in Latin grocery stores in a bottled, paste format as black mint paste.

Description
This species of marigold may grow to become from 0.6–2 meters tall.

Uses
Tagetes minuta has been eaten in various forms since pre-Columbian times. Dried leaves may be used as a seasoning and huacatay paste is used to make the popular Peruvian potato dish called ocopa. An herbal tea can be brewed from the leaves. An extraction of the plant, "Marigold oil", is used in the perfume, tobacco, and soft drink industry.

In addition to food, the plant can be used to produce dye, and as a green manure crop for biomass and a bio-fumigant for control of selected species of nematodes.

Toxicity
The oils contained in the oil glands that are found throughout the above ground portions of the plant may cause irritation to the skin and in some cases are said to cause photodermatitis.

Gallery

References

External links
 
 
 Plants for a Future: Tagetes minuta
 Purdue University, NewCROP: Tagetes minuta

 

minuta
Flora of South America
Flora of southern South America
Herbs
Plants described in 1753
Taxa named by Carl Linnaeus
Latin American cuisine